December (from Latin decem, "ten") or mensis December was originally the tenth month of the Roman calendar, following November (novem, "nine") and preceding Ianuarius. It had 29 days. When the calendar was reformed to create a 12-month year starting in Ianuarius, December became the twelfth month, but retained its name, as did the other numbered months from Quintilis (July) to December. Its length was increased to 31 days under the Julian calendar reform.

Dates
The Romans did not number days of a month sequentially from the first day through the last. Instead, they counted back from the three fixed points of the month: the Nones (5th or 7th), the Ides (13th or 15th), and the Kalends (1st) of the following month. The Nones of December was the 5th, and the Ides the 13th. The last day of December was the pridie Kalendas Ianuarias, "day before the Januarian Kalends". Roman counting was inclusive; December 9 was ante diem V Idūs Decembrīs, "the 5th day before the Ides of December," usually abbreviated a.d. V Id. Dec. (or with the a.d. omitted altogether); December 24 was IX Kal. Ian., "the 9th day before the Kalends of Ianuarius," on the Julian calendar (VII Kal. Ian. on the pre-Julian calendar, when December had only 29 days).

On the calendar of the Roman Republic and early Principate, each day was marked with a letter to denote its religiously lawful status. By the late 2nd century AD, extant calendars no longer show days marked with these letters, probably in part as a result of calendar reforms undertaken by Marcus Aurelius. Days were also marked with nundinal letters in cycles of A B C D E F G H, to mark the "market week".

See also
 December, for the modern calendar month.

References

Months of the Roman calendar
Roman calendar